The Rivalry is the tenth album by German band Running Wild. It is the second in a trilogy of a theme of good versus evil, which began with Masquerade and concluded with Victory. It is also their last album with drummer Jörg Michael.

Track listing
All songs by written by Rolf Kasparek except where noted

Note
 The limited edition CD release features the album's cover in 3D

Personnel
 Rolf Kasparek – vocals, guitar
 Thilo Hermann – guitars
 Thomas Smuszynski – bass guitar
 Jörg Michael – drums

Production
 Peter Lohde – Graphic design
 Gerhard Woelfe – Engineering, Mixing
 Rainer Holst – Mastering
 Rock 'n' Rolf – Producer
 Andreas Marschall – Cover art

Charts

References

Running Wild (band) albums
1998 albums
GUN Records albums